Efraín Elías "El Caimán" Sánchez Casimiro (26 February 1926 – 16 January 2020) was a Colombian footballer who played as goalkeeper. He competed for the Colombia national football team at the 1962 FIFA World Cup which was held in Chile. Among other teams, he played for San Lorenzo of Argentina in the 1940s. He won the Colombian league title three times during his career.

Career
Sánchez played for Mexican side Club Atlas in 1959.

After retiring as a player Sánchez went into management, taking charge of the Colombia national team on three occasions.

Honours

Club

 Independiente Medellín
 Campeonato Profesional: 1955, 1957

 Los Millonarios Bogotá
 Campeonato Profesional: 1964

References

External links

Profile (in Spanish)

1926 births
2020 deaths
Association football goalkeepers
Colombian footballers
Colombia international footballers
1962 FIFA World Cup players
1983 Copa América managers
Millonarios F.C. players
San Lorenzo de Almagro footballers
América de Cali footballers
Deportivo Cali footballers
Atlético Junior footballers
Independiente Medellín footballers
Independiente Santa Fe footballers
Atlas F.C. footballers
Categoría Primera A players
Liga MX players
Colombian expatriate footballers
Expatriate footballers in Argentina
Expatriate footballers in Mexico
Colombian football managers
Once Caldas managers
Atlético Junior managers
Colombia national football team managers
Sportspeople from Barranquilla
Deportes Quindío managers
1975 Copa América managers
Independiente Medellín managers